Nordwestdeutscher Rundfunk (NWDR; Northwest German Broadcasting) was the organization responsible for public broadcasting in the German Länder of Hamburg, Lower Saxony, Schleswig-Holstein and North Rhine-Westphalia from 22 September 1945 to 31 December 1955. Until 1954, it was also responsible for broadcasting in West Berlin. NWDR was a founder member of the consortium of public-law broadcasting institutions of the Federal Republic of Germany, the ARD.

On 1 January 1956, NWDR was succeeded by Norddeutscher Rundfunk (NDR) and Westdeutscher Rundfunk (WDR).

History

Pre-war
Broadcasting in what was to become NWDR's post-war transmission area was initiated in the early 1920s:
 On 2 May 1924, Nordische Rundfunk AG (NORAG) began broadcasting from Hamburg; the company was renamed Norddeutsche Rundfunk GmbH in November 1932.
 On 10 October 1924, Westdeutsche Funkstunde AG (WEFAG) began broadcasting from Münster; the company was renamed Westdeutsche Rundfunk AG (WERAG) in 1926 and moved its base of operations to Cologne.
 Both of these stations contributed programming to the national Reichs-Rundfunk-Gesellschaft (RRG), founded on 15 May 1925, in which the Deutsche Reichspost (post office) became the principal shareholder in 1926.
 In 1933 the RRG was fully nationalized by the Nazi government and from 1 April 1934 the two stations broadcast as, respectively, the Reichssender Hamburg and the Reichssender Köln.

Reichssender Hamburg
From 1934 the north German station operated, under the name of Reichssender Hamburg, as an integral part of the national broadcasting organization RRG – now controlled by Joseph Goebbels's Reich Ministry of Public Enlightenment and Propaganda and known from 1 January 1939 as Großdeutscher Rundfunk.

Externally, the Reichssender Hamburg transmitted propaganda material to listeners overseas – in particular to those living in the British Isles – and, during World War II, broadcast regular programming aimed at sapping the morale of the civilian population of the United Kingdom. Its most famous wartime broadcaster in English was William Joyce (popularly known, from his accent and speaking-manner, as "Lord Haw-Haw").

The Reichssender Hamburg was the last short-wave station to remain on the air in wartime Germany. Its substation in Flensburg, known as the Reichssender Flensburg, broadcast the last announcements from the headquarters of the German army, OKW, over local cable radio and announced the death of Adolf Hitler to the German people on 1 May 1945.

Post-war
All radio broadcasting ceased at the end of World War II and implementation of the Allied occupation of Germany.

In the British Zone of occupation, the military authorities quickly established a station known as "Radio Hamburg" to provide information to the population of the area. On 4 May 1945, transmission started with the announcement: "This is Radio Hamburg, a station of the Allied Military Government". The British Control Commission appointed Hugh Carleton Greene, on secondment from the BBC, to manage the creation of public service broadcasting in their Zone. On 22 September 1945, Radio Hamburg became Nordwestdeutscher Rundfunk (NWDR), the single broadcasting organisation of the British Zone. The army unit allocated to run the station was part of REME Royal Electrical and Mechanical Engineers and its commander was Lt Col Paul Archibald Findlay.

Split
In February 1955, the Länder of the NWDR's area decided to look again at the regulation of broadcasting. North Rhine-Westphalia decided to establish its own broadcaster, whilst Hamburg, Lower Saxony, Schleswig-Holstein continued with the existing system. To this end, the NWDR was split into two broadcasters - Norddeutscher Rundfunk (NDR) in the north and Westdeutscher Rundfunk (WDR) in North Rhine-Westphalia.

NDR continued to operate out of Hamburg, whilst the WDR was established in Cologne. The split was effective from 1 January 1956, although the station NWDR1 remained a joint operation with regional opt-outs.

The NWDR television service also remained a joint operation, from 1 April 1956 under the name  Nord- und Westdeutscher Rundfunkverband (North and West German Broadcasting Federation - NWRV). The NDR and the WDR launched separate television services for their area in 1961.

Stations
In 1955, the NWDR had three radio stations:

 NWDR1 - a station for the whole NWDR area, broadcast over FM and mediumwave.
 NWDR2 (or NWDR North) - a regional station on FM for north Germany, broadcast from Hamburg.
 NWDR3 (or NWDR West) - a regional program on FM for North Rhine-Westphalia, broadcast from Cologne.

NWDR was also the most active participant in ARD Das Erste, the joint German public television service.

See also 
 NDR Chor
 NDR Elbphilharmonie Orchestra
 NDR Radiophilharmonie

References

External links
 Research Centre for the History of Broadcasting in Northern Germany
 Hans-Ulrich Wagner, Return in Uniform. Walter Albert Eberstadt and the Beginning of Radio Hamburg, in: Key Documents of German-Jewish History, August 7, 2017.  

German radio networks
Defunct radio stations in Germany
Television channels and stations established in 1952
Television channels and stations disestablished in 1955
Defunct television channels in Germany
1945 establishments in Germany
1955 disestablishments in Germany
ARD (broadcaster)